This is a list of major political scandals in Germany:

1950s
 Bavaria casino scandal (1955–1962)

1960s
 Lockheed bribery scandals (1961–1979)
 Fibag scandal (1961)
 Spiegel affair ("Spiegelaffäre", 1962)
 German rocket experts in Egypt scandal (1962–1965)
 HS.30 scandal (1967–1969)

1970s
 "Radikalenerlass" or Berufsverbot (1970s)
 Steiner-Wienand scandal (1972)
 Guillaume affair (1974)
 Stammheim wiretapping scandal (1975–1976)
 Frankfurt SPD donation scandal (1975–1977)
 Rudel Scandal (1976)
 Schmücker trial (1976–1991)
 Filbinger scandal (1978)

1980s
 CDU secret party donations scandal ("Parteispendenaffäre"): "Flick affair" (1982)
 General Günter Kießling's supposed closet homosexuality (1984)
 U-Boat plans scandal, planned submarine sales to Apartheid South Africa (1986–1990)
 Waterkantgate, scandal around Uwe Barschel, carrying on past his mysterious death (1987–early 1990s)

1990s
 Putnik deal (1990)
 Dream boat scandal (1990–1991)
 Weapons scandal, Israeli inspection and acquisition of East German military hardware scandal, (1991)
 Amigo affair (:de:Amigo-Affäre), bribe-scandal forcing the Bavarian prime minister Max Streibl to resign in 1993
 Treuhand (mid-1990s)
 Drawer scandal (1993)
 Work villa scandal (1993)
 Plutonium affair (1995)
 CDU donations scandal (1999) ("Schwarzgeldaffäre")

2000s
 Berlin banking scandal (2001)
 Mediation scandal (2002)
 Dachau vote fraud (2002)
 Bonus miles scandal (2002)
 Munich CSU scandal (2003–2007)
 QMF scandal (2004)
 RWE payments scandal (2004)
 German Visa Affair (2005)
 BND surveillance of journalists scandal (2005)
 Sachsensumpf (2007)
 Deutsche Telekom surveillance scandal (2008)
 Libya scandal (2008)

2010s
 Guido Westerwelle's WikiLeaks controversy (2011)
 Guttenberg plagiarism scandal (Causa Guttenberg) (2011)
 Causa Wulff (2011)
 Bavaria nepotism scandal (2013)
 Stendal vote fraud (2014)
 Böhmermann affair (2016)
 Montblanc scandal (2016)
  (2017)
 Asylum office scandal (2018)
 Alternative for Germany donation scandal (2018)

2020s 

 Coup d'état plot (2022)
 Wirecard scandal (2022)

See also 

Political scandals in Germany
Germany
Scandals